Concrete Cowboys may refer to:
Concrete Cowboy (2020 film), an upcoming film starring Idris Elba
Concrete Cowboys (1979 film), a made-for-television western film directed by Burt Kennedy